Windows Mobile 6.1 was a version of the Windows Mobile operating system, released on April 1, 2008. It is a minor upgrade to the Windows Mobile 6 platform with various performance enhancements and a redesigned Home screen featuring horizontal tiles that expand on clicking to display more information, although this new home screen is featured only on Windows Mobile Standard edition. This was not supported in the Professional edition. Several other changes such as threaded SMS, full page zooming in Internet Explorer and 'Domain Enroll' were also added, along with a "mobile" version of the Microsoft OneNote program and an interactive "Getting Started" wizard. Domain Enroll is functionality to connect the device to System Center Mobile Device Manager 2008, a product to manage mobile devices. The most apparent of the other differences is that the Standard version (like prior versions) still creates automatic links for telephone numbers in Tasks and Appointments, which allows for the easier click and dial of stored telephone numbers within these Outlook items. This feature is not supported in the Professional version. Windows Mobile 6.1 also had improved bandwidth efficiency in its push-email protocol "Activesync" of "up to 40.02%"; this considerably improved battery life in many devices.

Operating System 
Aside from the visual and feature distinctions, the underlying CE versions can be used to differentiate WM6.0 from WM 6.1. The version of Windows CE in WM 6.0 is 5.2.*, with the final number being a 4 digit build ID (e.g. 5.2.1622 on HTC Wing). In WM 6.1, the CE version is 5.2.* with a 5 digit build number (e.g. 5.2.19216 on Palm Treo 800w).

See also

References 

Windows Mobile
Microsoft software
Discontinued versions of Microsoft Windows